Orthaga olivacea is a species of snout moth in the genus Orthaga. It was described by Warren in 1891. It is found in China, Japan, Taiwan and the Russian Far East.

References

Moths described in 1891
Epipaschiinae
Moths of Japan